Achiropsetta tricholepis, the Finless flounder or Prickly flounder, is a species of southern flounder with a southern circumpolar distribution. It lives in the Southwest Atlantic Ocean off Patagonia, the Falkland Islands and the Burdwood Bank, and also off the Ob Bank, Kerguelen Islands, Crozet Islands, and the Campbell Plateau. This species can grow to  TL.

References
 

Achiropsettidae
Taxa named by John Roxborough Norman
Fish described in 1930